The Vanoise massif is a mountain range of the Graian Alps, located in the Western Alps. After the Mont Blanc Massif and the Écrins Massif it is the third-highest massif in France, reaching a height of 3,885 m at the summit of Grande Casse. It lies between Tarentaise Valley to the north and the Maurienne Valley in the south. The range is the site of France's first national park, established in 1963, Vanoise National Park. The ski resorts of Tignes and Val-d'Isère and the 2,770-metre-high Col de l'Iseran are located in the eastern part of the range.

Principal summits
The principal summits of the Vanoise massif are:

 Grande Casse, 3,855 m
 Mont Pourri, 3,779 m
 Dent Parrachée, 3,697 m
 Grande Motte, 3,653 m
 Pointe de la Fournache, 3,642 m
 Dôme de la Sache, 3,601 m
 Dôme de l'Arpont, 3,601 m
 Dômes de la Vanoise, 3,586 m
 Dôme de Chasseforêt, 3,586 m
 Grand Roc Noir, 3,582 m
 Dôme des Nants, 3,570 m
 Aiguille de Péclet 3,561 m
 Mont Turia, 3,550 m
 Aiguille de Polset, 3,534 m
 Mont de Gébroulaz, 3,511 m
 Pointes du Châtelard 3,479 m
 Dôme des Platières, 3,473 m
 Roc des Saints Pères, 3,470 m
 Pointe de la Sana, 3,436 m 
 Pointe de l'Échelle, 3,422 m
 Pointe du Bouchet, 3,420 m
 Bellecôte, 3,417 m
 Grand Bec, 3,398 m
 Pointe du Vallonnet, 3,372 m
 Pointe Rénod, 3,368 m
 Dôme des Sonnailles, 3,361 m
 Pointe de Claret, 3,355 m
 Pointe de Méan Martin, 3,330 m
 Dôme de Polset, 3,326 m
 Dôme des Pichères, 3,319 m
 Grand Roc, 3,316 m
 Roche Chevrière, 3,281 m
 Pointe de Thorens, 3,266 m
 Mont Pelve, 3,261 m
 Épaule du Bouchet, 3,250 m
 Pointe des Buffettes, 3,233 m
 Aiguille Rouge, 3,227 m
 Pointe de la Réchasse, 3,212 m
 Pointe du Dard, 3,206 m
 Mont du Borgne, 3,153 m
 Mont Brequin, 3,130 m
 Pointe de la Masse, 2,804 m 
 Aiguille de la Vanoise, 2,796 m
 Sommet de la Saulire, 2,738 m
 Croix des Têtes, 2,492 m

Principal glaciers

 Glaciers de la Gurraz
 Glacier de la Savinaz
 Glacier de la Grande Motte
 Glacier de Prémou
 Glacier des Volnets
 Glacier de la Grande Casse
 Glacier de la Leisse
 Glacier des Fours
 Glacier de Méan Martin
 Glacier du Vallonnet
 Glaciers de la Vanoise (Glacier du Pelve, Glacier de l'Arpont, Glacier de la Mahure)
 Glacier de Gébroulaz
 Glacier de Thorens
 Glacier du Bouchet
 Glacier de Chavière
 Glacier de Polset
 Glacier du Geay

References

External links 
 The Vanoise Massif on SummitPost

Mountain ranges of the Alps
Mountain ranges of Auvergne-Rhône-Alpes